The 49ers–Seahawks rivalry is an American football rivalry between the San Francisco 49ers and the Seattle Seahawks in the National Football League (NFL). The Seahawks lead the series 30–20. The teams have met twice in the playoffs, a 23–17 Seahawks win in the 2013 NFC Championship Game and a 41–23 49ers triumph in the 2022 NFC Wild Card round.

History
Since the teams became NFC West division rivals in 2002, the rivalry has grown considerably. The rivalry was previously insignificant, due to both teams having little history against one another and both suffering long stretches of mediocrity. For example, while the Seahawks won four straight division titles from 2004 to 2007, the 49ers finished in third or fourth place each season and did not have a winning season from 2003 to 2010. Likewise, the Seahawks suffered four straight losing seasons from 2008 to 2011.

Both teams drafted young, mobile quarterbacks to lead their franchises, Seattle's Russell Wilson and San Francisco's Colin Kaepernick. Both coaches turned their respective franchises into perennial playoff contenders, and from 2010 to 2014, either the Seahawks or the 49ers won the NFC West championship.

The two teams met in the 2013 NFC Championship Game in Seattle with a trip to Super Bowl XLVIII on the line, with the Seahawks winning 23–17. The game ended when Seahawks' cornerback Richard Sherman, whom Harbaugh previously coached at Stanford, tipped an end zone pass that led to a game-ending interception. Sherman had his famous postgame interview immediately afterwards, calling out 49ers receiver Michael Crabtree and claiming to be the "best corner in the game". Seattle went on to defeat the Denver Broncos 43–8 in Super Bowl XLVIII to win their first Super Bowl championship. San Francisco had represented the NFC in a losing effort in Super Bowl XLVII the previous season. And in 2018 Richard Sherman, joined San Francisco and taking them to Super Bowl LIV and coming a quarter short sparked the rilvery for a short while then it died down again.

The Seahawks lead the all-time series 30–20. After drafting Russell Wilson in 2012, the Seahawks completely dominated the rivalry, holding a 17–4 record against the 49ers before Wilson's departure in early 2022.

Game results

|-
| 
| style="| 49ers  37–21
| Kingdome
| 49ers  1–0
| Seahawks join NFL as an expansion team and are placed in the NFC West. The following season, they were moved to the AFC West, where they remained through .
|-
| 
| style="| Seahawks  35–24
| Candlestick Park
| Tie  1–1
|
|-
| 
| style="| 49ers  19–6
| Candlestick Park
| 49ers  2–1
| 
|-
| 
| style="| 49ers  38–7
| Kingdome
| 49ers  3–1
| 49ers win Super Bowl XXIII.
|-
| 
| style="| 49ers  24–22
| Kingdome
| 49ers  4–1
|
|-
| 
| style="| Seahawks  38–9
| Kingdome
| 49ers  4–2
|

|-
| 
| style="| 
| style="| 49ers  31–24
| style="| 49ers  28–21
| 49ers  6–2
| Seahawks move to the NFC West as a result of NFL realignment. Seahawks open Seahawks Stadium (now known as Lumen Field).
|-
| 
| style="| 
| style="| Seahawks  24–17
| style="| Seahawks  20–19
| 49ers  6–4
| 
|-
| 
| style="| 
| style="| Seahawks  42–27
| style="| Seahawks  34–0
| Tie  6–6
| 
|-
| 
| style="| 
| style="| Seahawks  27–25
| style="| Seahawks  41–3
| Seahawks  8–6
| Seahawks lose Super Bowl XL.
|-
| 
| style="| 
| style="| 49ers  20–14
| style="| 49ers  24–14
| Tie  8–8
| 
|-
| 
| style="| 
| style="| Seahawks  23–3
| style="| Seahawks  24–0
| Seahawks  10–8
| 
|-
| 
| Tie 1–1
| style="| Seahawks  34–13
| style="| 49ers  33–30(OT)
| Seahawks  11–9
| 
|-
| 
| Tie 1–1
| style="| 49ers  23–10
| style="| Seahawks  20–17
| Seahawks  12–10
| 
|-

|-
| 
| Tie 1–1
| style="| 49ers  40–21
| style="| Seahawks  31–6
| Seahawks  13–11
| 
|-
| 
| style="| 
| style="| 49ers  33–17
| style="| 49ers  19–17
| Tie  13–13
| 
|-
| 
| Tie 1–1
| style="| 49ers  13–6
| style="| Seahawks  42–13
| Tie  14–14
| Seahawks draft Russell Wilson.  49ers lose Super Bowl XLVII.
|-
| 
| Tie 1–1
| style="| 49ers  19–17
| style="| Seahawks  29–3
| Tie  15–15
| Seahawks win Super Bowl XLVIII.
|-
|- style="background:#f2f2f2; font-weight:bold;"
|  2013 Playoffs
| style="| 
| 
| style="| Seahawks  23–17
|  Seahawks  16–15
|  2013 NFC Championship Game. Seahawks cornerback Richard Sherman deflects a last-minute pass intended for 49ers wide receiver Michael Crabtree to propel Seattle to Super Bowl XLVIII.
|-
| 
| style="| 
| style="| Seahawks  19–3
| style="| Seahawks  17–7
| Seahawks  18–15
| 49ers open Levi's Stadium. Game in San Francisco played on Thanksgiving. Seahawks lose Super Bowl XLIX.
|-
| 
| style="| 
| style="| Seahawks  20–3
| style="| Seahawks  29–13
| Seahawks  20–15
| 
|-
| 
| style="| 
| style="| Seahawks  25–23
| style="| Seahawks  37–18
| Seahawks  22–15
| 
|-
| 
| style="| 
| style="| Seahawks  24–13
| style="| Seahawks  12–9
| Seahawks  24–15
| 
|-
| 
| Tie 1–1
| style="| 49ers  26–23(OT)
| style="| Seahawks  43–16
| Seahawks  25–16
| Former Seahawks cornerback Richard Sherman signs with 49ers. Seahawks win 10 straight meetings (2014–18) and 8 straight home meetings.
|-
| 
| Tie 1–1
| style="| Seahawks  27–24(OT)
| style="| 49ers  26–21
| Seahawks  26–17
| 49ers win in Seattle (their first win in Seattle since 2011) in the final game of the season to clinch the NFC West and top seed. 49ers lose Super Bowl LIV.
|-

|-
| 
| style="| 
| style="| Seahawks  26–23
| style="| Seahawks  37–27
| Seahawks  28–17
| 49ers “home game” took place at State Farm Stadium in Glendale, Arizona due to COVID-19-related restrictions on contact sports in Santa Clara, and no fans attended either game.
|-
| 
| style="| 
| style="| Seahawks  28–21
| style="| Seahawks  30–23
| Seahawks  30–17
| Final start in the series for Russell Wilson.
|-
| 
| style="| 
| style="| 49ers  27–7
| style="| 49ers  21–13
| Seahawks  30–19
| 49ers clinch the NFC West division title with win in Seattle. 49ers sweep the Seahawks for the first time since 2011 and sweep the NFC West for the first time since 1997.
|- style="background:#f2f2f2; font-weight:bold;"
|  2022 Playoffs
| style="| 
| style="| 49ers  41–23
|  
| Seahawks  30–20
| NFC Wild Card playoffs
|-

|-
| Regular season
| style="|
| Seahawks 13–10
| Seahawks 16–9
| Includes Seahawks with a 1–0 record at State Farm Stadium in 49ers’ home games.
|-
| Postseason
| Tie 1–1
| 49ers 1–0
| Seahawks 1–0
| 2013 NFC Championship Game, 2022 NFC Wild Card playoffs
|-
| Regular and postseason 
| style="|
| Seahawks 13–11
| Seahawks 17–9
| 
|-

References

General
 49ers vs Seahawks Results

Specific

National Football League rivalries
San Francisco 49ers
Seattle Seahawks
San Francisco 49ers rivalries
Seattle Seahawks rivalries